Kfar Eldad is an Israeli settlement organised as a community settlement in the West Bank, south of Jerusalem. It is administered by the Gush Etzion Regional Council. The settlement is in the vicinity of Herodium and overlooks the Judean Desert. It is named after Israel Eldad, a Lehi member and Israeli philosopher.

The population of the settlement is made up of both native born Israelis and Russian immigrants. Secular and religious people live side by side in the settlement. The settlement was established by families from the nearby Nokdim settlement, and originally served as the site of temporary housing prior to that town's construction.

As of spring 2012, the settlement hosts some 80 families, and notable residents include leading Likud Knesset member Ze'ev Elkin.

The international community considers Israeli settlements in the West Bank illegal under international law, but the Israeli government disputes this.

References

Israeli settlements in the West Bank
Gush Etzion Regional Council
Populated places established in 1994
1994 establishments in Israel
Community settlements
Russian-Jewish culture in Israel
Judaean Desert